Doura  is a town and sub-prefecture in the Kouroussa Prefecture in the Kankan Region of eastern-central Guinea, near the border of Mali. As of 2014 it had a population of 18,675 people.

References

Populated places in the Kankan Region
Sub-prefectures of Guinea